Courchesne is the surname of the following people
Eric Courchesne, American researcher in autism
Luc Courchesne (born in 1952), Canadian artist and academic
Michelle Courchesne (born in 1953), Canadian politician in Quebec

See also
Courchene